The tenth season of the Australian version of the original NBC reality television series The Biggest Loser, known as The Biggest Loser Australia: Families 2 (stylised as TBL Families), premiered on 13 September 2015 and airs at 7.30pm Sundays to Tuesday on Network Ten. Daniel Jofre was crowned Biggest Loser, which saw him awarded $100,000. In addition, the Jofre family received $100,000 for being the family to lose the most weight.

Host and personalities

Teams

Contestants
The following is a list of contestants:

Premiere Week
For its premiere week, the trainers lived with the contestants, following their diet of poor nutrition, excessive portions and no exercise. They weighed in during the Week 1 episode, gaining 4.5 to 7.6 kg.

Weigh Ins 
Color key 

	

 Under the Red line and automatically Eliminated
 LEFT- The contestant left the competition before a weigh-in (via The Game or by choice)
 Last person eliminated before finale 
 The Biggest Loser among eliminated contestants
 The Biggest Loser Winner

Notes
 Rob said at the beginning of the competition that when he gets to 99 kilos, he's getting married. And that's what happened at finale. He reached 99 kilos then they got married at The Biggest Loser grand finale.
 In the first week, Johnee weighed in and lost 17.4 kilos, the biggest amount of weight lost by an individual in The Biggest Loser Australia.
 Daniel won Biggest Loser of the week six times, more than any other contestant in The Biggest Loser.

Family Weigh In

The family with the most weight percentage lost combined received $100,000

Ratings
 Colour key:
  – Highest rating during the series
  – Lowest rating during the series

References

External links
 

Australia
2015 Australian television seasons